Thao may refer to:

Thao people, a group of Taiwanese aborigines
Thao language, also known as Sao
Thao Nguyen, American singer-songwriter
Thao & the Get Down Stay Down, American musical group led by Nguyen
Thai honorific Thao
Thao Suranari, Thao Thep Kasattri and Thao Sri Sunthon, Thai heroines
Thao Vang Lor, character in Gran Torino
 Brigadier General Thao Ma, commander of the Royal Lao Air Force
Thao River, the upper reaches of the Hong River in northern Vietnam